The 2007 World Snooker Championship (also referred to as the 2007 888.com World Snooker Championship for the purposes of sponsorship) was a professional ranking snooker tournament that took place at the Crucible Theatre in Sheffield, England. It started on 21 April 2007 and was scheduled to finish on 7 May 2007, but continued into the early hours of 8 May, ending at 12:54 a.m. BST. The final broke the record for the latest finish time in a World Snooker Championship final, narrowly beating the 2006 final by two minutes.

Graeme Dott was the defending champion, but lost in the first round 7–10 to Ian McCulloch and became another World Champion who fell to the Crucible curse and could not defend his first World title.

John Higgins won his second World title by defeating qualifier Mark Selby 18–13 in the final.  The tournament was sponsored by online casino 888.com.

Tournament summary
 There were five debutants in this year's tournament: future Masters champion Mark Allen was the only one of the five to win his opening match, knocking out third seed and 1997 Champion Ken Doherty 10–7. Future world champion and future world number one Judd Trump won four qualifying matches, but lost 6–10 to Shaun Murphy after having led 6–5. Another future world number one, Ding Junhui, lost heavily to Ronnie O'Sullivan 2–10. David Gilbert led 7-time champion Stephen Hendry 5–1 at one stage before eventually losing 10–7. Irishman Joe Delaney won two final-frame deciders in Qualifying against Barry Pinches and double world semi-finalist Alan McManus, but was heavily defeated by Matthew Stevens 10–2 having trailed 0–5.
 Former world champion John Parrott made his final appearance at the Crucible, beating Steve Davis 10–9 in the first round before losing 8–13 to Shaun Murphy in the last 16.
 There were final-frame opening round wins for qualifiers Fergal O'Brien and Joe Swail over Barry Hawkins and Mark Williams respectively, Swail coming from 0–4 down. Mark Selby was even further behind, 0–5 against Stephen Lee before winning 10–7.
 Ian McCulloch qualified for the first time since his semi-final appearance in 2005. Having beaten defending champion Graeme Dott in the first round, he lost 8–13 to Anthony Hamilton in the last 16, and this would also prove to be his last appearance at the Crucible.
 Before the tournament began, Ronnie O'Sullivan alleged that the WPBSA draw had been fixed, after having been drawn in the first round against Ding, considered by bookmakers to be among the favourites for the title, and noting that he had drawn European Open and UK Champion, Stephen Maguire, in both 2004 and 2005. O'Sullivan later withdrew the accusation, and made no formal complaint to the WPBSA, who maintain that the draw was genuine.
 Shaun Murphy came back from 7–12 down to win his quarter-final match 13–12 against Matthew Stevens, a feat never before accomplished in a best-of-25-frame match.
 In frame 29 of his semi-final match, John Higgins compiled the Crucible's 1,000th century break.
Future four-time world champion Mark Selby reached his first final this year. He had a surprising run to the final, as he was a qualifier, he had only made his Crucible debut two years earlier, and he had not previously progressed beyond the last 16.
 The final had the latest finish in World Championship history, with the conclusion of the 31st and final frame coming at 12:54 a.m. BST, just two minutes later than in 2006.
 John Higgins' second world title came nine years after his first, the longest gap between wins since his namesake Alex Higgins. This was the longest gap between titles at the Crucible until 2018.

Prize fund
The breakdown of prize money for this year is shown below:

Winner: £220,000
Runner-up: £110,000
Semi-final: £42,000
Quarter-final: £22,000
Last 16: £14,000
Last 32: £10,600
Last 48: £7,400
Last 64: £4,500

Stage one highest break: £1,000
Stage two highest break: £10,000
Stage one maximum break: £5,000
Stage two maximum break: £147,000
Total: £941,000

Main draw
Shown below are the results for each round. The numbers in parentheses beside some of the players are their seeding ranks (each championship has 16 seeds and 16 qualifiers). The first round draw was done by presenters Bill Turnbull and Sian Williams of BBC Breakfast on 19 March and it was announced on Breakfast at 7.30 am BST the next day.

Preliminary qualifying
The preliminary qualifying rounds for the tournament took place in Pontin's Prestatyn, Wales.

Round 1

Round 2

Qualifying
Qualifying for the 2007 World Snooker Championship, was held between 23 February to 2 March 2007 at Pontin's, Prestatyn, Wales. The final qualifying round took place at the English Institute of Sport in Sheffield between the 12–15 March 2007.

Round 1

Rounds 2–5

Century breaks

Televised stage centuries
There were 68 centuries scored in the televised stage of the 2007 championship, which was joint equal highest in the history of the tournament (with the tournament held in 2002) until 2009.

144, 129, 112, 111  Ali Carter
143, 137, 131, 124, 108, 106, 102  Stephen Maguire
140  Neil Robertson
135, 134, 129, 122, 113, 110, 106, 104, 104, 100, 100  John Higgins
135  Ken Doherty
132, 131, 101, 101, 100  Shaun Murphy
130, 129, 128, 122, 121, 119, 116, 116, 111, 109, 104, 100  Mark Selby
129, 109, 105, 104, 100  Ronnie O'Sullivan
129  Barry Hawkins
126, 123  John Parrott
126  Stephen Lee
120  Fergal O'Brien

118, 108, 101  Matthew Stevens
118, 101  Mark Allen
114, 104  Nigel Bond
114, 104  Joe Swail
111, 107  Anthony Hamilton
110  Ian McCulloch
107  Marco Fu
103  Ding Junhui
100  Steve Davis
100  Ryan Day
100  Dave Gilbert

Qualifying stage centuries

 145  Rory McLeod
 142, 116, 106, 101  Judd Trump
 141, 107  David Morris
 139  Tian Pengfei
 139  Mark Selby
 138, 126, 112  James Leadbetter
 138  Robert Milkins
 136  Stuart Bingham
 135  Ian Preece
 134, 126  Ben Woollaston
 132  Marcus Campbell
 132  Jamie Cope
 131  Dominic Dale
 130, 115, 114, 106, 104, 103  Jamie Burnett
 130  Mark Joyce
 130  Jimmy White
 129, 117, 100  Mark Davis
 128, 124, 117, 102  Mark Allen
 128  Nigel Bond

 127  Ricky Walden
 126, 114  Ding Junhui
 124  Shokat Ali
 123, 115  Matthew Couch
 120  Joe Delaney
 115  Alfie Burden
 112, 101, 101  Joe Jogia
 112  Passakorn Suwannawat
 111, 106  Bradley Jones
 110, 104  Dave Gilbert
 105  Liang Wenbo
 104  Dave Harold
 104  Andy Hicks
 104  Issara Kachaiwong
 103  Jimmy Michie
 103  Liu Song
 102  Ian McCulloch
 101  Roy Stolk
 100  Scott MacKenzie

References

2007
World Championship
World Snooker Championship
Sports competitions in Sheffield
World Snooker Championship
World Snooker Championship